Jönköping Airport , earlier known as Axamo Airport, is an airport located about 8 km (5 mi) from Jönköping, Sweden.

History
The airport was founded and opened in September 1961 and was nationally owned until December 2009. It has been owned by the city of Jönköping since then.

It has lost many passengers, and was considered to be too small for a national airport. In 2008 it had 76,611 passengers, compared with 252,241 in 1998. The connection with Copenhagen has been closed and reopened a few times. The Stockholm route was closed in 2020. It had been declining for years and finally closed in 2020 after reduced demand as a result of the coronavirus pandemic. Many drive or take the train to their destination or a competing airport. The driving distance from Jönköping city center to the Göteborg Landvetter Airport is 122 km, to Stockholm Skavsta Airport 230 km, to Stockholm Arlanda Airport 363 km, and to Copenhagen Airport 326 km.

Airlines and destinations

Passenger

Cargo

Statistics

Traffic figures

Ground transportation

Bus 
Länstrafiken buses depart in connection to some flights.

Taxi 
In the arrival terminal there is a telephone direct connected to the local taxi company.

Parking 
There is parking at the airport, short-term and long-term parking lots.

See also 
List of the busiest airports in the Nordic countries

References

External links
Official website

Airports in Sweden
Buildings and structures in Jönköping
Airports established in 1961
1961 establishments in Sweden
International airports in Sweden